Gibson v. Florida Legislative Investigation Committee, 372 U.S. 539 (1963), was a United States Supreme Court case based on the First Amendment to the U.S. Constitution. It held that a legislative committee cannot compel a subpoenaed witness to give up the membership lists of his organization.

External links
 
 
First Amendment Library entry on Gibson v. Florida Legislative Investigation Committee

United States Supreme Court cases
United States Supreme Court cases of the Warren Court
United States Free Speech Clause case law
1963 in United States case law
Civil rights movement case law